Edmonton Green shopping centre is a large shopping centre in Edmonton, north London, which also encompasses a market. It is located close to Edmonton Green railway station and a large bus station, on The Broadway. The centre was first opened in 1967.

History and structure
The airy South Mall leading north is sheltered by a translucent roof and lined with a mix of shops. Leading off is the library and offices on three floors which was converted from a former departmental store. In the library, memorial boards to local people, from the old Town Hall can be viewed. The Market Square is a covered area (originally open to the elements) lit by clerestory windows. The market stalls today are permanent fixtures. The big, bustling no-frills market is popular with shoppers with a good range of goods, particularly - greengrocery. 

The North Mall is treated differently, in the harder spirit of the late 1960s: a concrete coffered roof alternates with open light-wells, and ends in an open square, with two levels of shops and two stories of flats above; brutalistic, dark brick and shuttered concrete. The backdrop rising from the deck above North Mall is composed of huge slabs of system-built flats which the borough built so keenly at the time.

It was redeveloped in 2008 with a new large ASDA supermarket.

In 2018, Crosstree Real Estate purchased the centre for £72 million.

Stores
, Edmonton Green Shopping Centre has over 100 stores, including Sports Direct, Deichmann and Matalan.

References

External links
Shopping in North London - Edmonton Green
Edmonton Green Shopping Centre 

Shopping centres in the London Borough of Enfield
Retail markets in London
Tourist attractions in the London Borough of Enfield
Edmonton, London